Mara is the ninth album by Scottish Celtic rock group Runrig, released in 1995. The title means 'of the sea' in Scots Gaelic. It is the last album featuring Donnie Munro on vocals and the fifth and final album released by the band on Chrysalis Records.

Track listing
 "Day in a Boat" - 2:56
 "Nothing but the Sun" - 7:15
 "The Mighty Atlantic" / "Mara Theme" - 6:43
 "Things That Are" - 4:55
 "Road and the River" - 4:29
 "Meadhan Oidhche air an Acairseid" (Midnight on the Harbour) - 4:53
 "The Wedding" - 4:11
 "The Dancing Floor" - 5:29
 "Thairis air a' Ghleann" (Beyond the Glen) - 3:48
 "Lighthouse" - 3:50

Personnel
Runrig
Iain Bayne - drums, percussion
Malcolm Jones - guitars, hurdy-gurdy, accordion
Calum Macdonald - percussion
Rory Macdonald - vocals, bass guitar
Donnie Munro - lead vocals
Peter Wishart - keyboards

Runrig albums
1995 albums
Chrysalis Records albums
Scottish Gaelic music